The 2022–23 season is Dundee's first season back in the second tier of Scottish football after being relegated from the previous season's Premiership. Dundee will also compete in both the Scottish League Cup, the Scottish Cup and the Scottish Challenge Cup.

Season summary

Pre-season 
Following Dundee's relegation the season prior, the club initiated a number of fundamental changes to the structure of the football department. After previously working mostly with the Youth Academy, Dundee's Technical Director Gordon Strachan would take a more active role with the first team going into the season. On 8 June 2022, Gary Bowyer was named as the new Dundee manager, with Billy Barr named as assistant manager. The club would also look to hire a Head of Recruitment to complete their structure, and would move the day-to-day operations of the club from Dens Park to Dundee and Angus College's Gardyne Campus.

July 
Dundee would start their competitive season off with a comfortable 3–0 win over fellow Championship side Hamilton Academical in the League Cup group stages. They would repeat this scoreline the following week down south against Stranraer. This would mark the first time since 2009 in which Dundee had won back-to-back games by a scoreline of 3 or more goals to nil. Dundee continued their positive start away to Championship rivals Queen's Park with a 1–2 win. They would cap off an impressive group stage campaign with a dominant 5–1 win over Forfar Athletic. Despite their strong start to the season, Dundee would struggle badly in the league opener against Partick Thistle, scoring 2 late goals but still losing 2–3.

August 
After a disappointing start to the league campaign, the Dee would recover with an away clean sheet win over Raith Rovers. They would continue their momentum with a gritty and impressive win over Arbroath to go top of the table, on an emotional night which commemorated the recently-passed Dundee legend Pat Liney. Dundee could not keep up the same momentum the following week at Cappielow however, having to settle for a goalless draw against Morton. Any sense of positive momentum would end with a hapless defeat to league leaders Ayr United at Somerset Park. Dundee would bounce back with a comfortable win over Scottish League One side Falkirk to reach the quarter-finals of the Scottish League Cup for the second consecutive year.

September 
Dundee would notch their second consecutive 3–0 win, dispatching Queen's Park at home with ease with a brace from Zach Robinson. Dundee's game against Cove Rangers was postponed after the death of Queen Elizabeth II. Despite controlling much of the game at home to Inverness CT, Dundee gave away slack goals and once again lost at home in frustrating fashion. The following week, Dundee would play their first competitive fixture outside of Scotland since the 2003–04 season in the UEFA Cup when they journeyed south to face Welsh champions The New Saints in the Scottish Challenge Cup, and would win comfortably in a match that would also mark Paul McGowan's 300th appearance for the Dark Blues.

October 
In a visit to New Douglas Park, Dundee would emerge victorious in a testy affair with Hamilton Academical that should have been more comfortable. Being their usual inconsistent selves however, Dundee thoroughly disappointed in an embarrassing defeat away to part-time Cove Rangers just a few days later. They would again fail to defeat part-time opposition in the following match away to Arbroath, having to settle for a point instead. They would finally get back on track the next week with a home victory over high-flying Ayr United, moving up to 4th in the process. A daunting trip to Ibrox Stadium followed, and despite a battling performance they would be knocked out of the Scottish League Cup by Rangers by a tight 1–0 scoreline. A few days later, ten-man Dundee would have to settle for a scoreless point at home to Greenock Morton in a wet and dreary affair. To cap off a busy month, Dundee scraped a lucky point away to Queen's Park after going behind twice.

November 
The month started off improbably for Dundee they came back from a two-goal deficit against Partick Thistle to win in dramatic fashion at Firhill Stadium. They would continue this positive momentum the following week, with Zach Robinson running the show and scoring both goals in a big home win over in-form Raith Rovers. Dundee would make it 7 league games unbeaten and 3 wins in a row next as they defeated bottom side Hamilton Academical 1–0 at Dens. The Dees were given a scare in the Scottish Cup the following week by Scottish League One side Airdrieonians, but 7 substitutes and an Airdrie red card helped Dundee dominate extra time, scoring four goals to end up with a convincing-looking 6–2 win. After a successful month in which the club won all their games, manager Gary Bowyer was named the Scottish Championship Manager of the Month, and Paul McMullan as the Championship's Player of the Month.

December 
The winning and unbeaten streak continued with a landmark victory, as Dundee defeated Inverness Caledonian Thistle in the Highlands in a league game for the first time in their history via a goal from in-form Paul McMullan, marking the club's first 4-game win streak in the league since October 2013. Dundee would keep the momentum up the following Thursday with a comfortable win away to Falkirk to reach the quarter-finals of the Challenge Cup, making it 6 straight wins in all competitions. Unfortunately however, their next game against Cove Rangers would be postponed after ice and snow caused stadium and pitch damage to Dens Park. Dundee would end the year with yet more cheer, topping the league for Christmas after a double by Luke McCowan against his former club Ayr United clinched a win to pip the Honest Men to top spot despite an early straight red for Josh Mulligan, marking Dundee's seventh consecutive win in all competitions, their first such run since February 1974, as well as their fourth consecutive league clean sheet, and fifth in their last 6 games in all competitions.

January 
Dundee's momentum came to a screeching halt in the new year, and despite coming back from 2 goals and a man down they would suffer defeat against part-time Arbroath, knocking them off top spot. It took a late equaliser from Jordan McGhee to snatch a point at Stark's Park four days later. Dundee would have a home stretch planned, but issues with a now waterlogged Dens Park resulted in three call-offs during the month. After a two-week period without a game, Dundee would match Scottish Premiership club St Mirren evenly in the Scottish Cup before being knocked out on penalties. They would finally play a home game the following Tuesday in the Scottish Challenge Cup quarter-finals, defeating League One leaders Dunfermline Athletic (managed by former Dundee boss James McPake) to progress to the semi-finals in a high-scoring affair. Despite being dogged by injuries and disjointed by squad changes, Dundee comfortably beat league leaders Queen's Park to end the month on a high note.

February 
Dundee opened up the month in frustrating fashion, failing to capitalise on chances and having to settle for a point against bottom side (albeit in good form) Hamilton Accies. They then somehow snatched defeat from the jaws of victory in the Challenge Cup semi-final against Raith Rovers, going out on penalties after leading by multiple goals late on. The club would return to winning ways in their following match, a comfortable 3–0 victory over Cove Rangers. However, they would once again falter against bogey team Greenock Morton, losing 1–0 at Cappielow. The inconsistent form would continue the following week at home to Inverness CT, where a fluke goal conceded and doing everything but scoring the winning goal (despite having a good goal chopped off due to incompetent refereeing) led to a very disappointing draw and Dundee falling further behind in the title race. Their bottle completely crashed in their game in hand at home to Partick Thistle, being handily beaten in a dismal performance.

March 
Dundee started March with a much-needed win away to Cove Rangers to close the gap at the top to two points ahead of a two-week hiatus. Dundee started their final round of fixtures flatly with a drab goalless affair away to Partick Thistle, which left them seven points behind the league leaders.

Competitions 
   

All times are in British Summer Time (BST).

Pre-season and friendlies

Scottish Championship 

Dundee will play against Arbroath, Ayr United, Cove Rangers, Greenock Morton, Hamilton Academical, Inverness Caledonian Thistle, Partick Thistle, Queen's Park and Raith Rovers during the 2022–23 Championship campaign. They will play each team four times, twice at home and twice away.

League table

Results by round

Scottish Cup 

Dundee entered the competition in the 3rd round. Their 3rd round win over Airdrieonians would see six goals scored by Dundee, their highest tally in a Scottish Cup game game since a 7–0 win over Nairn County in the 1985–86 season.

Scottish League Cup 

Dundee were a top seed in the group stage draw that took place on 25 May 2022 at 13:00 on FreeSports and the SPFL's YouTube channel. Dundee were drawn into Group H along with Hamilton Academical, Queen's Park, Forfar Athletic and Stranraer.

Group stage

Knockout stage 
Dundee were seeded in the second round as one of the three best group winners. The draw will took place following the final group stage game on 24 July.

Group H table

Scottish Challenge Cup 

Dundee will compete in the Scottish Challenge Cup, and will enter the competition in the 3rd round on the weekend of 23-25 September 2022. The draw took place on 29 August 2022 at 13:00 on SPFL's YouTube channel.

Squad statistics 

|-
|colspan="14"|Players away from the club on loan:

|-
|colspan="14"|Players who left the club during the season:

|}

Transfers

Summer

Players in

Players out

Winter

Players in

Players out

See also 

 List of Dundee F.C. seasons

References 

Dundee F.C. seasons
Dundee